Pope Urban II (r. 1088–1099) created 71 cardinals in ten consistories that he held throughout his pontificate. He elevated his two successors Gelasius II and Innocent II as cardinals in 1088 and Honorius II in 1099.

1088
 Domnizzone
 Odon de Châtillon O.S.B. Clun.
 Pietro
 Amico O.S.B. seniore
 Giovanni
 Gregorio
 Gianroberto Capizucchi
 Robert
 Bone seniore
 Riso
 Leone
 Gregorio Paparoni
 Alberico
 Gregorio
 Paolo Gentili
 Benedetto
 Landolfo Rangone
 Giovanni da Gaeta O.S.B. Cas.
 Gregorio O.S.B.
 Gregorio
 Gregorio Papareschi Can. Reg. Lat. seniore
 Raniero
 Cosma
 Giovanni O.S.B.
 Pagano
 Leone O.S.B. Cas.
 Azone

1090
 Ubaldo
 Bovo
 Oddone
 Giovanni

1091
 Gualterio
 Rangier O.S.B.

1092
 Berardo
 Bruno

1093
 Giovanni Minuto

1094
 Theodoric
 Geoffroy O.S.B.
 Alberto

1095
 Maurizio
 Anastasio
 Buonsignore
 Dietrich
 Hermann
 Hugues
 Rogero

1097
 Raniero
 St. Bernardo degli Uberti O.S.B. Vall.

1098
 Milon

1099
 Offo
 Pietro
 Bobone
 Pietro
 Raniero
 Lamberto Scannabecchi Can. Reg. O.S.A.
 Gerardo
 Ottone
 Alberto
 Sigizzone seniore
 Benedetto
 Giovanni
 Giovanni
 Litusense
 Gionata seniore
 Bobone
 Gregorio Gaetani
 Stefano
 Ugo
 Aldo da Ferentino
 Bernardo

Notes and references

Sources

College of Cardinals
Urban II
11th-century cardinals
11th-century Catholicism
Cardinals created by Pope Urban II